The Society for Studies of Interplanetary Travel (OIMS) was founded in Moscow in May 1924. It was a spin-off of a military science society at the Zhukovsky Airforce Academy, and was chaired by Grigory Kramarov. Its 200 charter members included important Soviet space-exploration and rocketry experts such as Konstantin Tsiolkovsky, Fridrikh Tsander, and Vladimir Vetchinkin.  The society allowed engineers and educators to meet and discuss space travel, and it organized public educational events.

OIMS hosted a famous public debate on October 4, 1924 to discuss the idea of Robert Goddard to launch a rocket to the Moon.

The society existed for only about one year.

References

Scientific organizations established in 1924
Scientific societies based in Russia
Soviet and Russian space institutions
Space science organizations
Space program of the Soviet Union